The 1992 Kilkenny Senior Hurling Championship was the 98th staging of the Kilkenny Senior Hurling Championship since its establishment by the Kilkenny County Board since 1887. The championship began on 4 July 1992 and ended on 11 October 1992.

Ballyhale Shamrocks were the defending champions, however, they were beaten by Clara at the quarter-final stage. Graignamanagh were relegated from the championship after seven seasons.

On 11 October 1992, Glenmore won the championship after a 1-14 to 2-06 defeat of Tullaroan in the final. It was their third championship title overall and their first title in two championship seasons.

Glenmore's Ray Heffernan was the championship's top scorer with 1-32.

New format

On 13 January 1992, a new championship format was approved by a considerable 40-11 vote at a special meeting of the Kilkenny County Board. The old group stage and knock-out format was abolished in favour of the creation of a new Kilkenny Senior Hurling League. comprising 12 teams divided into two groups of six, to be followed by a straight knock-out championship. Both competitions were linked as the top two teams from each league group received byes to the quarter-finals of the championship. The remaining eight teams entered the first round proper of the championship, with the four losing teams contesting the relegation play-offs.

Team changes

To Championship

Promoted from the Kilkenny Intermediate Hurling Championship
 Dicksboro

From Championship

Relegated to the Kilkenny Intermediate Hurling Championship
 Mooncoin

Results

First round

Relegation play-offs

Quarter-finals

Semi-finals

Final

Championship statistics

Top scorers

Overall

References

Kilkenny Senior Hurling Championship
Kilkenny Senior Hurling Championship